Ga-Mashie is the home of the original Ga settlers and the original name of Accra, Ghana's capital. They celebrate the Homowo festival.

References 

Neighborhoods of Accra